Diocese of Argos can refer to:

 Metropolis of Argolis, active Greek Orthodox see
 Latin Bishopric of Argos, Roman Catholic see instituted during the Crusades and Venetian rule